Okhotnichy (masculine), Okhotnichya (feminine), or Okhotnichye (neuter) is the name of several rural localities in Russia:
Okhotnichy, Primorsky Krai (or Okhotnichye), a selo in Pozharsky District of Primorsky Krai
Okhotnichy, Udmurt Republic, a village in Staroutchansky Selsoviet of Alnashsky District in the Udmurt Republic
Okhotnichye, Republic of Crimea, a settlement under the administrative jurisdiction of the town of republic significance of Yalta in the Republic of Crimea
Okhotnichye, Kaliningrad Oblast, a settlement in Mozyrsky Rural Okrug of Pravdinsky District in Kaliningrad Oblast

Notes